Ferenc Lenkei (born 23 March 1946) is a retired Hungarian breaststroke swimmer who won a bronze medal in the 4 × 100 m medley relay at the 1966 European Aquatics Championships. He finished sixth in the same event at the 1964 Summer Olympics.

References

External links
 
 
 
 

1946 births
Living people
Swimmers at the 1964 Summer Olympics
Olympic swimmers of Hungary
Hungarian male swimmers
European Aquatics Championships medalists in swimming
Male breaststroke swimmers
Universiade medalists in swimming
Universiade silver medalists for Hungary
Medalists at the 1965 Summer Universiade
Swimmers from Budapest
20th-century Hungarian people
21st-century Hungarian people